Dmitry Vladimirovich Guz (born 15 May 1988) is a Russian professional association football player. He plays for Kaluga.

Club career
Guz played 6 seasons in the Russian Football National League for FC Rotor Volgograd and FC Tyumen.

On 19 July 2020, Ararat-Armenia announced that Guz had left the club after two-year with his contract expiring. On 21 July 2020, Guz signed for FC Urartu.

On 25 January 2022, Alashkert announced the signing of Guz.

Career statistics

Club

Honours

Club 
Ararat-Armenia
 Armenian Premier League (2): 2018–19, 2019–20
 Armenian Supercup (1): 2019

References

External links
 
 

1988 births
People from Krasnosulinsky District
Living people
Russian footballers
Association football defenders
FC Nika Krasny Sulin players
FC Rotor Volgograd players
FC Tyumen players
FC Luch Vladivostok players
FC Ararat-Armenia players
FC Urartu players
FC Atyrau players
Russian First League players
Russian Second League players
Armenian Premier League players
Kazakhstan Premier League players
Russian expatriate footballers
Expatriate footballers in Armenia
Expatriate footballers in Kazakhstan
Sportspeople from Rostov Oblast